The Bowes River is a river in the Mid West region of Western Australia. It was named on 6 April 1839 by the explorer George Grey while on his second exploration expedition along the Western Australian coast. It was named for Mary Bowes, Dowager Countess of Strathmore, the wife of Sir William Hutt. Hutt was a British Liberal politician who was heavily involved in the colonization of New Zealand and South Australia, and the brother of John Hutt, the second governor of Western Australia. Sir William Hutt was a member of the 1836 select committee on Disposal of Lands in the British Colonies. Grey named the nearby Hutt River after Hutt.

The river then continues in a westerly direction before discharging into the Indian Ocean south of Horrocks.

The river has two tributaries: Sandy Gully and Nokanena Brook.

Lead contamination from Nokanena Brook has also been recorded in Bowes River.

References

Rivers of the Mid West region